The men's 5000 metres at the 2019 Asian Athletics Championships was held on 24 April.

Results

References

5000
5000 metres at the Asian Athletics Championships